Sexenio is the popular term for the term of office on the President of Mexico. The president is limited to a single six-year term, and no one who holds the office even on a caretaker basis is permitted to run for or hold the office again. It is one of the country's most important political institutions because it is one of the few significant limitations on executive power in Mexico, which is strong at local, state, and national levels. The sexenio is seen as a reaction to the failed experiment of re-election in Mexico during part of the Porfiriato era (1876–1911). In addition to restricting the presidency, state governors also face this restriction; no one elected as a governor may ever hold the post again, even on an interim basis.

The principle of "no reelection" is so entrenched that when the constitution was amended in 2014 to allow federal legislators and municipal mayors to run for immediate reelection, the ban on any sort of presidential reelection remained unchanged.

Origin
The no reelection policy was designed by a group of Mexicans who, disgruntled with the dictatorship of Antonio López de Santa Anna, proposed various legislative amendments in what they called the Plan of Ayutla in 1854. In 1857 a new constitution (a duplicate of the 1824 constitution with additional elements included), with this amendment, was passed. Then, the presidential term was for four years. Later, during the presidency of Plutarco Elías Calles the term of office was extended to six years, implemented following the 1928 election.

Success

Although the intention of the sexenio was to prevent presidential dictatorship, this system has not met with total success. This was in part because the presidency was monopolized by the Institutional Revolutionary Party (PRI) from 1929 to 2000. From 1929 to 1994, presidents approaching the end of their sexenio personally chose the PRI's presidential nominee in the next election. The PRI's dominance was so absolute that the president essentially chose his successor; in the case of Plutarco Elías Calles, there is strong evidence suggesting that he basically continued ruling through the next three presidents by using them as puppets, leading to the six-year period to being called the Maximato, after Calles's sobriquet jefe máximo ("Maximum Leader"). The PRI's grip on power was eventually broken at the 2000 election, where Vicente Fox (PAN) became the first opposition candidate elected president in three generations.

See also
 Other offices where the president is limited to a single six-year term:
President of the Confederate States of America (defunct)
President of Mongolia
President of the Philippines
 Quinquennat
 La ley de Herodes
 Term limits
 Term of office

External links
 http://www.globalsecurity.org/military/world/mexico/president.htm
 http://www.sjsu.edu/faculty/watkins/mexhist01.htm

Politics of Mexico

Term limits